The Argentine presidential election of 1868 was held on 12 April to choose the president of Argentina. Domingo Sarmiento was elected.

Background
Presiding over a prosperous economy overshadowed somewhat by the costly Paraguayan War, President Mitre was at pains to avoid risking the tenuous national unity his administration had secured. Though he hand-picked prospective candidates, Mitre avoided the appearance of direct support for any one figure, while limiting the field to those he considered acceptable. Electors from Buenos Aires Province favored Autonomist Party candidate Adolfo Alsina, who was instead persuaded by Mitre to run for the vice-presidency. The nomination was handed to the Ambassador to the United States, Domingo Sarmiento, who remained at his post and did not campaign. Mitre also supported former Unitarian Party leader Rufino de Elizalde and his running mate General Wenceslao Paunero, a key figure in Mitre's victory at the Battle of Pavón. These candidates were all preferred by the president over that year's dark horse, former President Justo José de Urquiza (whom Mitre attempted to dissuade from running for fear of the separatist conflict his presence might provoke).

These candidates were, with the exception of Sarmiento, contentious in many circles and provided the new system its first real test. The electoral college met on 12 April 1868, and selected Sarmiento by 79 out of 131 votes, making this the only closely contested race during this era.

Results

Results by Province

Notes

References
 
 
 
 
 

1868 elections in South America
1868 in Argentina
1868
Elections in Argentina